Jonathan Rogers,  (16 September 1920 – 10 February 1964) was a Welsh-born sailor and an Australian recipient of the George Cross, awarded for the heroism he displayed on the night of 10 February 1964 during the sinking of .

Early life
Rogers was born in Llangollen, Wales, joined the Royal Navy at the age of 18 and was awarded the Distinguished Service Medal for the "coolness and leadership" he showed while serving as coxswain of Motor Torpedo Boat 698 in action in May 1944. 'Buck' emigrated to Australia after the war and joined the Royal Australian Navy, serving in the Korean War.

George Cross
He was serving aboard the destroyer  when, during exercises, it was struck and sliced in half by the aircraft carrier . Rogers, along with more than 50 other men, was trapped in the sinking forward part of the stricken destroyer.

Making no attempt to save himself, he helped as many men as possible escape through a small escape hatch and, as the compartment sank ten minutes later, was heard leading his trapped comrades in a prayer and hymn as they met their fate, as his citation said, with 'dignity and honour'.

Honours and awards

References

External links
 

1920 births
1964 deaths
People from Llangollen
Australian recipients of the George Cross
Australian military personnel of the Korean War
Deaths due to shipwreck at sea
Recipients of the Distinguished Service Medal (United Kingdom)
Royal Navy sailors
Royal Australian Navy personnel
Royal Navy personnel of World War II
British emigrants to Australia
Military personnel from Denbighshire